Ereshkigal is the name of two fictional characters appearing in American comic books published by Marvel Comics.

Goddess
Ereshkigel, a Babylonian goddess, first appeared in Thor Annual #10, in 1981. She was part of a group of Death gods trying to increase their power, but she was absorbed along with the others by Demogorge, the God-Eater. Ereshkigal and the other gods were freed by Thor, and have not made any similar attempts. She was portrayed as a pale-skinned woman with batlike wings. She is the fictional counterpart to the Mesopotamian goddess Ereshkigal.

Deviant

Publication history
The second Ereshkigal is a member of the Marvel Universe's Deviant race, first appearing in Thor #284 (June 1979), and was created by Roy Thomas and John Buscema. The character subsequently appears in Quasar #30 (Jan. 1992), and #35-50 (June 1992-Sept. 1993).

Ereshkigal received an entry in All-New Official Handbook of the Marvel Universe A-Z #4 (2006).

Fictional character biography
She is a shapeshifter, able to take human form, or a winged form that resembles Marvel's version of the goddess whose name she assumed. She claims to be millennia old and like many Deviants has greater strength, stamina and durability than a human. She seems to have impersonated the goddess Ereshkigel throughout history. Her sister Dragona is a member of the Delta Network of Warlord Kro.

Ereshkigel was assigned to investigate the City of the Space Gods, home of the Celestials, by Brother Tode, leader of the Deviants. She assumed a human appearance and boarded an airplane headed for the Andes mountains. The plane was captured by the Celestials and brought into their hidden city for examination. However, another passenger on that plane was Don Blake, the secret identity of Thor, and another was Ajak of the Eternals. Thor was able to easily overcome Ereshkigal and turned her over to Ajak.

Later, she again took a human identity as H.D. Steckley (an alias formerly used by Moondragon), and schemed to get Quasar's power-bands. When she discovered the existence of an even more powerful artifact, the Star Brand, she attempted to acquire it. She befriended Quasar's secretary, Kayla Ballantine, who possessed the Brand, even becoming her roommate. When Kayla was recruited by an alien world to defend them from the Starblasters, "H.D." went with her and watched Kayla easily destroy a fleet of warships. They then returned to Earth.

The power of the Star Brand attracted the attention of Kismet, whom Kayla fought and seriously injured. Kayla, distraught, wished she didn't have the power any more, and "H.D." offered to take it. After the power was transferred, she then revealed her true self to a dismayed Kayla.

Ereshkigel flew to the pandimensional portal called the Nexus of Realities, easily defeating its guardian, the Man-Thing. She summoned the pantheon of powerful beings known as the Congress of Realities, and offered to overthrow the current guardians of the Multiverse and give free rein to the Congress. A few chose to follow her, and she destroyed the rest with her near-infinite power.

The cosmic guardian known as the Living Tribunal challenged Ereshkigel to a contest of champions, winner take all. Quasar and the Silver Surfer were chosen as champions; both were told the stakes involved, but not which side they represented. However, by observing the effects of their fight on the cosmic beings known as Master Order and Lord Chaos, Quasar was able to determine that he represented the side of Chaos and allowed himself to lose. Defeated, Ereshkigal committed suicide, and the Living Tribunal took possession of the Star Brand.

Much later, Ereshkigal was resurrected and captured an Asgardian doomsday  artifact: the Unbiding stone. Meanwhile the Deviants' males were rendered sterile by a plague and Ereshkigal took advantage of the chaos to have a power contest with Priestlord Ghaur, offering the Deviants the great power of the Unbiding stone. Ghaur won the contest when he promised the deviants the return of their fertility with the help of the kidnapped eternal Phastos. The Asgardian god Thor rescued Phastos and battled Ghaur and Ereshkigal. When the Unbiding stone was destroyed, Ghaur and Erishkigal disappeared and Kro  was left leading the Deviants.

References

External links

 

Marvel Comics characters who are shapeshifters
Marvel Comics characters with superhuman strength
Marvel Comics deities
Marvel Comics Deviants
Thor (Marvel Comics)
Characters created by Roy Thomas
Characters created by John Buscema
Fictional characters with superhuman durability or invulnerability